The 1983 Bridgestone Doubles Championships was a women's tennis tournament played on indoor carpet courts in Tokyo in Japan that was part of the 1983 Virginia Slims World Championship Series. The tournament was held from March 28 through April 3, 1983.

Winners

Women's doubles

 Billie Jean King /  Sharon Walsh defeated  Kathy Jordan /  Anne Smith 6–1, 6–1
 It was King's 1st title of the year and the 167th of her career. It was Walsh's 2nd title of the year and the 13th of her career.

 
Bridgestone Doubles Championships
WTA Doubles Championships
Bridgestone Doubles Championships
Bridgestone Doubles Championships
Bridgestone Doubles Championships
Bridgestone Doubles Championships
Bridgestone Doubles Championships